Rodgers is an English patronymic surname deriving from the given name of "Rodger" which was popular amongst the Viking settlers of Normandy. The name simply means "son of Rodger." Variant form of Rogers.

The name Rodger is of Old German origin and is likely derived from the Germanic name Hrodger meaning "famous spear", composed of the elements hruod "fame" and ger "spear".

In England, the name Rodger could’ve derived from the pre-7th century Old English name Hrothgar, which means 'fame spear' ("hroð" fame or renown, "gari" spear), the first reference to which is in Beowulf ,the Anglo-Saxon epic poem. The name was probably first introduced into England during the Anglo-Saxon settlement of Britain.

However, it is more likely that the name Rodger was introduced to England after the Norman Conquest of 1066. In Normandy, the name "Rodger" was reinforced by the Old Norse cognate Hróðgeirr and was very popular with the Norsemen. It was they who "borrowed" it from the Gauls they conquered, as they swept through on their long march from Scandinavia to their home in Normandy. According to a 2020 study, those with the surname are more likely to have Viking ancestors.

The Normans brought the name to England, where it replaced the name "Hroðgar" (Old Norse: Hróarr). The name of a legendary Danish king, living in the early 6th century mentioned in Beowulf, Widsith, and also in Norse sagas.

From the Old Norse, Hroð-geirr; from the Danish, Roedeger, Rodgers; from the Flemish, Roger; from the French, Rogier; from the German, Roger; from the Latin, Rodegerus, Rodeghiero; in the Domesday Book, Roger.

It was introduced to Ireland when the Anglo-Normans invaded in the 1170s and then later in the Cromwellian invasions. However, many occurrences of it in Ireland represent an Anglicisation of Mac Ruaidhrí and Mac Ruairí in the newer and current standard spelling.

The surname Rodgers was first found in the Hundredorum Rolls of 1273 as Adam filius Rogeri in Lincolnshire; and Robert filius Rogeri in Norfolk. Kirby's Quest of Somerset listed Waltero Rogero in Somerset, 1 Edward III (during the first year of Edward III's reign.) Over 100 years later, the name had evolved from the early Latin versions that held either the vowel "i" or "o" to the more recent spellings we understand today. The Yorkshire Poll Tax Rolls of 1379 listed Willelmus Rogerson and as a personal name Rogerus Smyth.

The name was "rare or absent in England north of a line drawn from the River Humber to the River Mersey. Scattered over the rest of England and also Wales, but generally infrequent in the eastern counties, being by far the most numerous in the western half of its area. It is most common in Herefordshire and Shropshire, and also in Cornwall." This author continues "Rodger is the Scotch form, it has no definite distribution. In England we only find it occasionally, as in the case of Rodgers in Derbyshire."

From this vantage, we explored the aforementioned "Scotch" (Scottish) origin further. In this case, many of the records were recorded in the Anglo-Saxon or English version rather than the previous entries that had the Latin form. "Roger was appointed abbot of Dryburgh in 1152. Roger, son of Oggou, attested a deed of middle of thirteenth century. William Roger was tenant of the abbot of Coupar-Angus in 1468." Black continues "Rodgers is the more common form with Scots. Rogers, in some parts of central Scotland, is pronounced Rodgie, and some Gaelic-speaking people in Perthshire pronounce it Rougie and sometimes Royger. John Rodgers, born in Maryland, 1771, son of a Scots colonel of militia, fired with his own hand the first shot in the war with Great Britain in 1812."

"The family of Rogers of Home, in Shropshire, are a cadet of the Norburys of Norbury in that county. In 7. Edward II., (seventh year of Edward II's reign) Roger de Norbury, son of Philip, and grandson of Roger de Norbury, had a grant of the estate of Home. His son took the name of Rogers, and his posterity under that appellation have ever since resided at Home."

Roger of Salisbury (died 1139), "also called Roger the Great, bishop of Salisbury and justiciar, was of humble origin, and originally priest of a little chapel near Caen. The future king, Henry I, chanced, while riding out from Caen, to turn aside to this chapel to hear mass. Roger, guessing the temper of his audience, went through the service with such speed that they declared him the very man for a soldier's chaplain, and Henry took him into his service."

Notable people with the name include:

Surname 
Aaron Rodgers (born 1983), American football player
Alan Rodgers (born 1959), American science fiction and horror writer, editor, and poet
Amari Rodgers (born 1999), American football player
Andre Rodgers (1934–2004), American professional baseball player
Andy Rodgers (born 1983), Scottish footballer
Andy Rodgers (musician) (1922–2004), American Delta blues harmonicist, guitarist, singer and songwriter
Anton Rodgers (1933–2007), British actor and director
Bill Rodgers (disambiguation), several people
Brendan Rodgers (disambiguation), multiple people
Buck Rodgers (born 1938), American baseball player and manager
Calbraith Perry Rodgers (1879–1912), American aviation pioneer
Christopher Raymond Perry Rodgers (1819–1892), American admiral
Clodagh Rodgers (born 1947), Northern Ireland singer and actress
Daniel T. Rodgers (born about 1932), American historian and emeritus
Dave Rodgers (Giancarlo Pasquini, born 1963), Italian songwriter, composer, and producer
David H. Rodgers (1923-2017), American politician
Eleazar Rodgers (born 1985), South African footballer
Francis Silas Rodgers (1841–1911), American cotton merchant of Charleston, South Carolina
Frederick Rodgers (1842–1917), American admiral
George Rodgers (disambiguation), several people
Guy Rodgers (1935–2001), American professional basketball player
Ilona Rodgers (born 1942), British actress and television presenter
Ira Rodgers (1895–1963), American football, basketball, baseball, and golf player and coach
Isaiah Rodgers (born 1997), American football player
Jacquizz Rodgers (born 1990), of the Atlanta Falcons
James W. Rodgers (1910–1960), American criminal executed by firing squad in Utah
Jimmie Rodgers (country singer) (1897–1933), American country singer
Jimmie Rodgers (pop singer) (1933–2021), American pop singer
Jimmy Rodgers (basketball) (born 1943), American basketball coach
John Rodgers (disambiguation), several people
Johnny Rodgers (born 1951), American football player
Jordan Rodgers (born 1988), American football player; brother of Aaron
Joseph Lee Rodgers (born 1953), American psychologist
Lorraine Rodgers (1921–2018), American pilot, first American woman to fly in World War II
Luke Rodgers (born 1982), English footballer (soccer player)
Marion Rodgers (1921–2017), American military pilot, Tuskegee Airmen
Marion Elizabeth Rodgers, American author and scholar
Mary Rodgers (1931–2014), American composer and author of childrens books, daughter of Richard Rodgers
Mighty Mo Rodgers (born 1942), American blues musician and record producer
Nigel Rodgers (born 1952), British writer and campaigner
Nile Rodgers (born 1952), American bassist and producer
Paul Rodgers (born 1949), British singer-songwriter
Pepper Rodgers (1931–2020), American football player and coach
Raymond P. Rodgers (1849–1925), American admiral
Richard Rodgers (1902–1979), American composer
Richard Rodgers II, American football tight end
Sonny Rodgers (1939–1990), American blues guitarist, singer and songwriter
T. J. Rodgers (born 1948), American businessman
Thelma Rodgers, Antarctic scientist from New Zealand
Thomas Malin Rodgers (1943–2012), puzzle collector and founder of Gathering 4 Gardner
W. R. Rodgers (1909–1969), known as "Bertie" Rogers, Northern Ireland poet
William Ledyard Rodgers (1860–1944), American admiral
Woodall Rodgers (1890–1961), American attorney, businessman, and mayor of Dallas

Given name
Rodgers Grant (1935–2012), American jazz pianist, composer, and lyricist
Rodgers Kola (born 1989), Zambian footballer
Rodgers Rop (born 1976), long-distance runner from Kenya

See also
Rodgers House (disambiguation)
Rodgers Instruments, organ builder (Rodgers Organs, digital and pipe combination organs)
Rodgers Stores, defunct chain of stores in Portland, Oregon
Rural Municipality of Rodgers No. 133, Saskatchewan, Canada
Rodger, a surname
Rogers (surname)
Rogers (disambiguation)

References

English-language surnames
Scottish surnames
Patronymic surnames
Surnames from given names